Peter Norreys is professor of inertial fusion science at the University of Oxford and is an Individual Merit Fellow of the Science and Technology Facilities Council.

In 2013 Norreys won the Institute of Physics Cecilia Payne-Gaposchkin Medal and Prize.

In 2017 Norreys was accused of sexual harassment.
https://www.telegraph.co.uk/news/2017/11/11/oxford-professor-accused-sexual-harassment-allegedly-asked-researcherwhat/

References

Academics of the University of Oxford
British physicists
Living people
Year of birth missing (living people)
Fellows of University College, Oxford
Fellows of the American Physical Society